Ashe is a village in the Basingstoke and Deane district of Hampshire, England. The River Test commonly rises in the village.

Governance
The village is part of the civil parish of Overton, and is part of the Overton, Laverstoke and Steventon ward of Basingstoke and Deane borough council. The borough council is a non-metropolitan district of Hampshire County Council.

References

External links
 
 

Villages in Hampshire